Esteban Urquizu Cuéllar (born April 11, 1981, in Yamparáez Province) is a peasant leader, governor of Chuquisaca, and the youngest governor in Bolivia. He is affiliated with the Movement for Socialism (MAS), for which he previously served as a member of the Constituent Assembly. He won the 2010 gubernatorial election in Chuquisaca with 53.6% of the vote. Previously, he led the Chuquisaca Peasant Worker Federation. His wife is Alejandra Picha and former Prefect (a post new replaced with the governorship) of Chuquisaca. Savina Cuéllar is his aunt.

References

1981 births
Living people
Movement for Socialism (Bolivia) politicians
Members of the Chamber of Deputies (Bolivia)
Bolivian trade unionists